Francesco Montanari may refer to:

Francesco Montanari (painter) (1750–1786), Italian painter
Francesco Montanari (actor) (born 1984), Italian actor